Caryocolum leucomelanella is a moth of the family Gelechiidae. It is found in most of Europe, except Ireland, Great Britain, the Benelux, Portugal, Fennoscandia and the Baltic region. It is also found in Russia (the Ural Mountains and Siberia: Altai, Transbaikalia and Tuva).

The length of the forewings is 3.5–5 mm for males and 4-5.5 mm for females. The forewings are blackish with an orange-brown subcostal streak near the base and with white markings.

The larvae feed on Petrorhagia saxifraga, Dianthus carthusianorum, Dianthus sylvestris and possibly Dianthus gratianopolitanus and Dianthus seguieri. They have been recorded feeding in shoots, but also boring the stem, creating small stem-galls. Pupation takes place in a cocoon on the ground at the end of April. Larvae can be found from the beginning of May to June.

References

Moths described in 1839
leucomelanella
Moths of Europe
Moths of Asia